Vikas Nagar is a village in the Nicobar district of Andaman and Nicobar Islands, India. It is located in the Nancowry tehsil. It is populated by people from the former Trinket village, which was evacuated after the 2004 Indian Ocean earthquake and tsunami.

Demographics 

According to the 2011 census of India, Vikas Nagar has 48 households. The effective literacy rate (i.e. the literacy rate of population excluding children aged 6 and below) is 74.27%.

References 

Villages in Nancowry tehsil